Brett Trevor Holman (born 27 March 1984) is a former Australian professional footballer who last played for Brisbane Roar in the A-League as an attacking midfielder.

Born in Sydney, Holman played youth football for Northern Spirit before making his senior debut for Parramatta Power. He then moved to the Netherlands, where he played for a number of years before moving to Aston Villa in 2012 to play in the English Premier League. Holman moved to the UAE one year later, before returning to Australia to play for Brisbane Roar in 2016.

Holman represented Australia over 60 times between 2006 and 2013, scoring eight goals. This included goals at the 2010 FIFA World Cup and the 2011 AFC Asian Cup. He had previously represented Australia several times at youth level, including travelling to the 2004 Summer Olympics and the 2001 FIFA U-17 World Championship.

Early life

Brett Holman was born in Bankstown, Sydney. He grew up in the Sydney suburb of Croydon Park. He attended Christian Brothers High School in Lewisham. He played junior football for the Enfield Rovers Soccer Club based in the inner west of Sydney. He left school in late 2000 to pursue his footballing career, signing with the Parramatta Power.

Club career

Holman played for Northern Spirit and Parramatta Power in Australia before moving to Dutch football club Feyenoord in 2002.
Once in the Netherlands he played for SBV Excelsior on loan before NEC Nijmegen signed him in 2006.

On 7 April 2007 Holman scored two goals for NEC Nijmegen against Eredivisie leaders, PSV Eindhoven. He was named man of the match, as NEC Nijmegen won 2–1.  He was signed by AZ Alkmaar manager Louis van Gaal in the European summer of 2008 for €3m.

On 1 November 2008 Holman scored his first goal for AZ Alkmaar in a 3–3 away draw against SC Heerenveen at the Abe Lenstra Stadion in Heerenveen after coming on as a second-half replacement for Nick van der Velden.

During most of the AZ Alkmaar's title-winning 2008–2009 Eredivisie season Holman struggled for starting opportunities and at the end of the campaign was rumoured to be on his way out at the club. However, he was retained and was given more playing time under the new manager.

Under Dick Advocaat Holman has been given substantially more game time, including a number of appearances in the UEFA Europa League. On matchday 6, Holman impressed in AZ Alkmaar's 1–1 draw against Standard Liège.

Aston Villa

In March 2012, Holman signed a pre-contract agreement with Aston Villa, to join the club when his AZ contract expired that summer.

On 1 July 2012, Holman officially became an Aston Villa player. On 14 July Holman scored on his debut, in a 2–1 victory against Burton Albion in the first match of pre-season. He then scored his second goal for Villa in another pre-season match, this time against Peterborough United in a 2–0 victory on 1 August 2012. On 1 December 2012, Holman scored his first league goal away at QPR. He then followed this up with his first League Cup goal for Villa, scoring the first of four in a 4–1 victory over Norwich City in the quarter-finals.

On 21 June 2013, he was released by mutual consent at the end of the 2012–13 season. He then joined Al Nasr in Dubai, signing a two-year contract.

Brisbane Roar
On 1 September 2016, it was confirmed that he had signed for Brisbane Roar in the A-League on a 2-year deal where he will be paid within the cap in the first year and as marquee in the second year.

In November 2021, Holman won a legal battle against Brisbane Roar over insurance money the club withheld when he suffered a career-ending injury, with the Roar ordered to pay Holman $369,433.26 for an insurance payout, $41,815 in interest, as well as covering his court costs.

International career
Holman made his international debut for Australia in 2006 against Bahrain.

On 19 June 2010, Holman scored the opening goal against Ghana at the 2010 FIFA World Cup in South Africa in a 1–1 draw, following up from a Marco Bresciano free kick. On 24 June 2010, he then scored the second goal in the final group stage match against Serbia with a swerving 25-yard drive. On 10 January 2011, Holman scored the third goal in Australia's 4–0 win over India in the Asian Cup. Holman scored a crucial equaliser for Australia against Oman in Sydney on 26 March 2013 in a World Cup Qualifier.

On 30 April 2014, Holman announced his retirement from international football.

Career statistics

Club

International
International goals

Honours

AZ
Eredivisie: 2008–09
Dutch Super Cup: 2009

Al-Nasr
 UAE League Cup: 2014–15
 UAE President's Cup: 2014–15

Australia
 OFC U-17 Championship: 2001

Individual
 FFA Male Footballer of the Year: 2012

See also
 List of Australia international soccer players with over 50 caps
 List of foreign football players in the Netherlands
 List of foreign Premier League players

References

External links
 
 OzFootball profile
 

1984 births
Living people
Association football forwards
Parramatta Power players
Feyenoord players
Brisbane Roar FC players
Excelsior Rotterdam players
NEC Nijmegen players
AZ Alkmaar players
Aston Villa F.C. players
Al-Nasr SC (Dubai) players
Emirates Club players
National Soccer League (Australia) players
Eredivisie players
Eerste Divisie players
Premier League players
Australia international soccer players
Olympic soccer players of Australia
Footballers at the 2004 Summer Olympics
Australian expatriate soccer players
Expatriate footballers in the Netherlands
Australian expatriate sportspeople in the Netherlands
Expatriate footballers in the United Arab Emirates
Australian expatriate sportspeople in the United Arab Emirates
Soccer players from Sydney
2007 AFC Asian Cup players
2010 FIFA World Cup players
A-League Men players
2011 AFC Asian Cup players
UAE Pro League players
Marquee players (A-League Men)
Australian soccer players